Gordon Smith is a former football (soccer) player who represented New Zealand at international level.

Smith scored a hattrick on his full All Whites debut in a 5–6 loss to South Africa on 28 August 1947. and ended his international playing career with six A-international caps and 7 goals to his credit, his final cap an appearance in a 0–7 loss to Australia on 28 August 1948.

Three of his brothers also represented New Zealand, Vic Smith and Roger Smith playing official international appearances, while the third brother, Jack Smith, only played in unofficial matches. Ryan Nelsen, grandson of another brother, Bob Smith, also played for New Zealand.

References

Year of birth missing
Possibly living people
New Zealand association footballers
New Zealand international footballers
20th-century New Zealand people
Association football forwards